The 1985 Supertaça Cândido de Oliveira was the 7th edition of the Supertaça Cândido de Oliveira, the annual Portuguese football season-opening match contested by the winners of the previous season's top league and cup competitions (or cup runner-up in case the league- and cup-winning club is the same). The 1985 Supertaça Cândido de Oliveira was contested over two legs, and opposed Benfica and Porto of the Primeira Liga. Porto qualified for the SuperCup by winning the 1984–85 Primeira Divisão, whilst Benfica qualified for the Supertaça by winning the 1984–85 Taça de Portugal.

The first leg, which took place at the Estádio da Luz, saw Benfica defeat Porto 1–0. The second leg, which took place at the Estádio das Antas, saw a 0–0 scoreline (1–0 on aggregate), which granted the Águias a second Supertaça.

First leg

Details

Second leg

Details

References

Supertaça Cândido de Oliveira
Super
S.L. Benfica matches
FC Porto matches